Sydney Football Club is an Australian professional soccer club based in Sydney, New South Wales. It competes in the country's premier men's competition, A-League Men, under licence from Australian Professional Leagues (APL). The club was founded in 2004 and entered the A-League as one of the eight original teams for the inaugural 2005–06 season.

Sydney is the most successful association football club in Australian history, having won five Championships and four Premierships in the A-League, as well as one FFA Cup and the Oceania Champions League in 2005, prior to Australia joining the Asian Football Confederation. The club has become a dominant force and consistent performer in recent times within the top-flight, a surge led by managers Graham Arnold (2014–2018) and Steve Corica (2018–present). Since 2015, the club has achieved a top-two finish (thereby winning qualification for the Asian Champions League) in six out of eight seasons, appeared in five A-League Grand Finals and three FFA Cup Finals, and won seven major trophies.

Prior to the 2018–19 season, the club's home ground was Allianz Stadium in Moore Park. When the NSW Government announced that the stadium would be redeveloped in the lead up to the 2019 New South Wales state election, Sydney FC played its home matches at the neighbouring Sydney Cricket Ground, along with the suburban Jubilee Oval and Leichhardt Oval grounds. In October 2022, the club returned to the newly built Allianz Stadium in Moore Park, playing rivals Melbourne Victory FC. The club is currently building a new training and administration facility in North Ryde, known as Sky Park, which is also scheduled for completion in 2022.

As the only A-League team in the city for the first seven years of its existence, the club's fans hail from all across the Sydney Metropolitan Area. Sydney's main supporter group is known as 'The Cove', named after the original title given to the colonial settlement of Sydney, Sydney Cove. This name has attracted controversy due to the effects of colonisation upon Indigenous Australians. The club has rivalries with the Western Sydney Wanderers, named the Sydney Derby, and Melbourne Victory, known as The Big Blue. Alex Brosque is the club's all time top goal scorer, having scored 83 goals. Rhyan Grant has the most appearances for the club with 299 games.

History

2004–2009: Early years

The first steps towards the foundation of Sydney FC were taken in April 2004 when Soccer New South Wales (now Football NSW) announced its intention to bid for a licence in the new A-League competition. The bid was lodged with the Australian Soccer Association (now Football Federation Australia) on 19 July, challenged only by a consortium headed by Nick Politis, known as the "Sydney Blues", for Sydney's place in the 'one team per city' competition. A public row broke out between the two bidders after reports that the ASA were set to vote in favour of Sydney FC, causing Politis to withdraw his support for a team, and leaving Sydney FC as the only candidate remaining.

Sydney FC was officially launched as a member of the new 8-team A-League on 1 November 2004, with a 25% stake in the club held by Soccer NSW, the remainder privately owned. Walter Bugno was announced as the inaugural chairman of the club. On 11 December 2004, Soccer NSW announced that it would pull out of its involvement with Sydney FC amid concerns over part owner Frank Lowy's autocratic style in establishing the club and lack of consultation with Soccer NSW on key Sydney FC issues. These included the choice of the Sydney Football Stadium over Parramatta Stadium as the team's home ground, and the erosion of Soccer NSW's initial 100 per cent involvement to just 25 per cent.

By February 2005, Sydney FC had filled 16 of its allowed 20 squad positions—attracting Socceroos Alvin Ceccoli, Clint Bolton, Steve Corica and David Zdrilic as well as youth internationals Justin Pasfield, Mark Milligan, Wade Oostendorp, Iain Fyfe and Jacob Timpano. German Pierre Littbarski was signed as head coach, assisted by former Norwich City player Ian Crook. Sydney FC played its first ever match against Manly United FC on 25 March 2005, winning 6–1. Shortly after, Sydney FC set off on a tour to the United Arab Emirates to play against local teams FC Hatta, Al Ain FC and Al Jazira, winning all three. Whilst in Dubai, Sydney FC announced that it had agreed to terms with former Manchester United player Dwight Yorke as the club's "marquee player"– one paid outside of the $1.5million salary cap— for two seasons.

Sydney FC's first competitive match was against Queensland Roar at Central Coast Stadium in Gosford as part of the 2005 Australian Club World Championship Qualifying Tournament. After winning 3–0, Sydney went on to defeat Perth Glory and Central Coast Mariners to qualify for the 2005 Oceania Club Championship, held in Tahiti. Despite an early scare against New Zealand club Auckland City FC, Sydney FC won all of its matches and qualified for the 2005 FIFA Club World Championship in Japan. The start of the 2005 A-League Pre-Season Challenge Cup marked Sydney FC's first match at Allianz Stadium, as well as Dwight Yorke's first appearance for the club. Yorke scored the first goal of Sydney FC's 3–1 win which stretched its unbeaten run to 9 competitive matches (15 including friendlies). Upon reaching the semi-finals, Sydney's unbeaten run finally ended at 11 with Perth Glory midfielder Nick Ward scoring in injury time to inflict the new club's first ever loss.

Sydney FC's first season was ultimately a success. Finishing second behind Adelaide United they went on to defeat Central Coast Mariners 1–0 in the 2006 A-League Grand Final with Steve Corica scoring in the second half of the game. However, the club's success wouldn't last long, with German manager Pierre Littbarski leaving the club after refusing to accept a lower salary and inaugural marquee player Dwight Yorke being signed by Premier League club Sunderland. Former English international Terry Butcher was signed as Sydney FC's new coach for 2006–07. However it was regarded as an overall failure, with Sydney playing poorly despite the signing of Alex Brosque and Benito Carbone as a Guest player. Sydney also had 3 points deducted during the season, after it was found that they had breached the Salary cap, involving player David Zdrillic. Despite the off field problems, Sydney managed to scrape into the finals series, however they lost in the semi-final to Newcastle Jets. Although Butcher led the club into the finals, Sydney fans were unhappy with his tactics. In the end Butcher and Sydney FC went their separate ways at the end of the season. Sydney FC would go on to sign Branko Čulina for its 2007 Asian Champions League campaign, where they finished second in the group, one point behind ultimate champions and J-League heavyweights Urawa Red Diamonds. Despite the ACL success, Sydney FC's start to the 2007–08 season was poor, and the club sacked him, replacing him with former Adelaide United manager John Kosmina. Sydney FC played well for the rest of the season but were knocked out in the finals by Brisbane Roar. Kosmina couldn't repeat the success of the previous season, replacing Brazilian international Juninho with Socceroos hero John Aloisi on a million dollar contract. The club also unveiled Newcastle Jets championship winners Mark Bridge and Stuart Musialik as well as Socceroo Simon Colosimo for the 2008–09 season. The season did not live up to expectations even with these key signings. Aloisi didn't perform very well during the season and came under heavy fire. So too did manager Kosmina, whose tactics were seen as controversial. His relationship with the media often became angry and frustrated which didn't help causes. Many players fell out of favour with the coach, including Steve Corica and Clint Bolton. For the first time in the club's history, they failed to make the play-offs. As a result Kosmina was fired when Russian billionaire David Traktovenko became owner in March 2009.

2009–2012: Lavicka tenure
The fresh change at the club was about to bear fruit, when Sydney announced they had signed Czech Republic manager Vítězslav Lavička. Lavicka completely changed the structure of the club, and for its first time turning it into a serious, European style football club. He kept faith in Steve Corica and John Aloisi and several others who had threatened to walk out, and as a result, Sydney FC won its first premiership. Sydney made it to the Grand Final of the fifth season of the A-League after defeating Wellington Phoenix in the preliminary final. The Grand Final was played against Melbourne Victory at Etihad Stadium in Melbourne. Sydney took the lead after 61 minutes through a Mark Bridge header, just seconds after Melbourne had a goal disallowed for offside. Melbourne equalised through Adrian Leijer in the 81st minute, and the game went to a penalty shootout with no goals scored in extra time. Melbourne skipper Kevin Muscat missed his penalty, with his shot hitting the post. Sydney FC won the Grand Final 4–2 on penalties which handed the club its second Hyundai A-League Championship.

Sydney FC's title defence did not go smoothly. The club lost key players from its championship-winning side including Steve Corica (retired), Karol Kisel (return to Europe), Simon Colosimo, John Aloisi, and Clint Bolton (all Melbourne Heart). The club however picked up the services of former Socceroo Nick Carle from his stint in England with Crystal Palace. This wasn't enough to steer the team in the right direction. The club was winless for the first ten rounds of the competition. Sydney FC managed to pick up a few points over the next few rounds but another five-game losing streak ensured they would not qualify for the finals competition, finishing ninth. The third season under Lavicka began with the major signing of Blackburn Rovers player Brett Emerton on a three-year deal. The signing was significant in that Emerton became the first player to directly exchange the FA Premier League for the A-League by terminating his Rovers contract one year early. The season however, only provided minimal success as the club scraped through to the finals series with a 3–2 win over Newcastle Jets in the final round of the regular season. Before the end of the season the club announced that head coach Lavicka's contract would not be renewed for the following season.

2012–2014: Farina reign
 

The 2012–13 season was one of high drama. There was a new head coach Ian Crook and a high turnover of players in the off season. The expectations changed from a year of rebuilding to title contenders when the club acquired the services of international superstar Alessandro Del Piero. He signed on for $2 million per year and became the highest-paid player ever in the A-League.

After only six weeks into the regular season Sydney were forced to find a new coach with the shock resignation of Crook. He cited the role was "a constant burden" and was adversely affecting his health. Frank Farina was confirmed as Crook's successor for the season two games into Steve Corica's interim spell. During the January transfer window, Farina bolstered his defensive stocks with Socceroos captain Lucas Neill and Brazilian Tiago Calvano joining the team. The pair made nil significant impact and with a 3–1 loss away from home to Brisbane Roar, Sydney were unable to pick up a vital point that would have seen them play in the finals, finishing seventh.

For the 2013–14 pre season, the club became the first club in A-League history to tour in Europe, as Sydney toured in Venice, Italy, where the club played against Del Piero's first professional club, Padova, Udinese Calcio, Vicenza Calcio, A.S. Cittadella, Venezia and Reggiana. Sydney won half of these six games however upon returning home lost five consecutive friendly games in the lead up to the season proper. Two-thirds of the way into the season and with Sydney FC only accumulating 4 points from 8 games, fans began to express concerns over the vision for the club. Banners at the club's home game against Adelaide included sentiments like "We want Farina gone." There was also a mass exodus from the club's active supporter group, The Cove. The club then held a fan forum to receive questions and communicate the direction of the club. During the last nine rounds, Sydney FC only lost two games making the finals. The club lost to Melbourne Victory in the first week of the finals. This marked the end of the Frank Farina reign.

2014–2018: Arnold era

On 8 May 2014, Sydney FC announced its new head coach for the 2014–15 A-League season. With retirements to Brett Emerton in January and Terry McFlynn, and the contract expirations of marquee player Alessandro Del Piero, foreign player Ranko Despotović and former Socceroo Richard Garcia, there was a lot of experience to be filled by the club. Arnold announced his first signing on 12 May 2014, acquiring the services of his former Mariner winger Bernie Ibini-Isei. Sydney FC then announced signings of prolific A-League goalscorer Shane Smeltz and Socceroo Alex Brosque. After months of searching Arnold found his new marquee man in Austria national football team captain Marc Janko. On 8 October 2014, Brosque was announced as captain for the 2014–15 A-League season, alongside vice-captains Sasa Ognenovski and Nikola Petković. Sydney FC's season began with the highly anticipated match-up against the newly re-branded Melbourne City FC and guest superstar David Villa. Whilst not starting the game, Villa came on early in the second half to claim the equalising goal, the result ending 1–1. Sydney FC continued on an eight-game undefeated streak that ended when Perth Glory FC came from behind to score two goals in the final seven minutes to claim victory at Allianz Stadium. The following week saw another thrilling Big Blue in Melbourne ending 3–3. Sydney FC struggled for form as they moved closer to the January break for the AFC Asian Cup, not scoring in four consecutive matches. During this break, Sydney FC were able to bolster their stocks, signing Senegalese internationals Mickaël Tavares and Jacques Faty as injury replacement players. Upon resumption, Sydney FC posted 19 (out of a possible 21) points in the next seven rounds. Whilst slipping up twice at home to Melbourne City and Adelaide United FC (with scores of 0–1 in both games) during the final six rounds, Sydney FC managed to win all four other games away from home to finish second on the ladder with 50 points for the season. By the end of the regular season, Sydney FC had broken many records including a record club home season attendance (41,213 vs. Western Sydney Wanderers FC) and a league record number of away games undefeated in a season, as well as becoming the first club to score three or more goals in five consecutive games. Marquee Marc Janko also set his own A-League record for most consecutive goalscoring appearances with seven. After having the first week of the finals off, Sydney FC met Adelaide in the semi-finals at home. A brace from Alex Brosque set Sydney up for a 4–1 win. Ultimately, Sydney FC were outplayed in the 2015 A-League Grand Final, defeated by Melbourne Victory FC 3–0 at Melbourne Rectangular Stadium.

The following season was significantly less successful, finishing seventh in the league despite the star power of marquee Filip Hološko, and Serbian playmaker Miloš Ninković. However, Arnold coached the Sky Blues through a tough Asian Champions League group, finishing first and defeating defending champions Guangzhou Evergrande 2–1 at Allianz. Sydney progressed to the knockout stages for the first time, losing on away goals to Chinese side Shandong Luneng with Hao Junmin scoring a 90th minute equaliser to finish the Sky Blues continental hopes.

Arnold reformed Sydney for the 2016–17 season, beginning with the signings of Socceroos centreback Alex Wilkinson, and leftback Michael Zullo both from Melbourne City. Joshua Brillante joined the Sky Blues on a three-year deal, keeping him at the Harbour City until 2019. The goalkeeping ranks were soon bolstered by the signing of Danny Vukovic, the A-League's most capped player who also held a record A-League clean sheet tally. Bernie Ibini-Isei also rejoined the club on loan from Club Brugge KV, following a horrific leg injury. The biggest signing however was that of Brazilian striker Bobô on a one-year marquee deal, rejoining his former Beşiktaş teammate Filip Holosko. The season started with a 4–0 win over rivals Western Sydney in the Sydney Derby with new striker Bobô scoring on debut. They went on a six-game winning streak from this, conceding one goal. The club also reached the 2016 FFA Cup Final for the first time, losing to Melbourne City 1–0, in a highly controversial match.

This did not affect the momentum however, with Arnold's men going 19 games unbeaten before losing to arch rivals Western Sydney Wanderers in the Sydney Derby. Despite this setback, Sydney FC marched on yet again, winning the Premier's Plate with four games to spare and breaking numerous A-League records, including: most competition points, most wins in a season, fewest goals conceded, most clean sheets and best goal difference. Marquee striker Bobô ended the regular season as top scorer with 15 goals, narrowly missing Marc Janko's record of 16. The club qualified for the 2018 AFC Champions League after finishing first, which was their fourth Asian Champions League campaign.

They finished the season as double winners – winning the 2017 A-League Grand Final 4–2 (1–1 AET) on penalties against Melbourne Victory at their former home ground, Allianz Stadium. The winning penalty was scored by Johnny Warren Medallist Miloš Ninković who re-signed for a following year the next day, before also being named player of the year for the third time at the club's awards night.

The Sky Blues went on a successful FFA Cup run in 2017, starting with an 8–0 thumping of Northern Territory amateur side Darwin Rovers FC, with Bobô scoring a club record equalling 4 goals in the match. The following round they played NPL2 side Canterbury Bankstown FC, winning 3–0 in a fairly scrappy match, with goals from Carney, Bobô, and a debut goal from new signing Adrian Mierzejewski in injury time to put them through to the quarter finals. Sydney drew Melbourne City, marking the third battle between the two in the cup. An early goal from Jordy Buijs put Sydney up 1–0, before a second half goal from captain Alex Brosque sealed the win at Leichhardt Oval. In the semi-finals, they faced yet another Melbourne side, with a trip to Lakeside Stadium to play South Melbourne FC booked. The Sky Blues ran out 5–1 winners, with a brace from Bobô sealing their date with destiny in the 2017 FFA Cup Final to play Adelaide United FC. The final was played at Sydney Football Stadium, only the second time it had hosted an FFA Cup match. The Harbour City Originals opened the scoring on 20 minutes, as Milos Ninkovic latched onto a through ball, before sliding past a defender and poking a shot past goalkeeper Paul Izzo. The slender one-goal lead only had them in front until an equaliser by Nikola Mileusnic got Adelaide back into the game. The game was forced into extra time, before Bobô scored a header on 111 minutes to win the FFA Cup for Sydney FC.

The 2017—18 season proved to be successful after the FFA Cup win, with the Sky Blues becoming the first ever club to win back-to-back premierships in the A-League era, and the first in Australian national league history since Melbourne Knights FC.

With Graham Arnold being chosen to take over the Australian national team coaching role after the 2018 World Cup, his time at the club ended when his team were defeated 3–2 by Melbourne Victory, after extra time in a semi-final of the A-League finals series of 2017/18.

2018–present: Corica era
Steve Corica became the ninth permanent head coach of Sydney FC when his tenure was officially announced on 16 May 2018. The announcement followed his ongoing thirteen year involvement with the club, signing on as a player in the inaugural 2005/06 season. After his retirement in 2010, Corica served his time as staff member for the club in various roles of assistant coach, youth team coach and the caretaker first team coach for two games in 2012. The off-season would prove be a crucial first test for Corica in terms of recruitment for some key positions. It had already been announced that key players from prior seasons including Dutch defender Jordy Buijs, former Socceroos Luke Wilkshire, David Carney and Matt Simon had all left the club as well as youth product Anthony Kalik returning to Europe as his loan deal expired. After the re-signing of current captain and club legend Brosque within the first week of Corica's tenure things appeared to be going well for Corica. On 7 July 2018, after weeks of speculation, the club officially confirmed the exit of Johnny Warren Medalist Adrian Mierzejewski and the newly re-signed Golden Boot winner, Bobô, leaving big holes to fill in attack. In the following weeks after Bobô and Adrian Mierzejewski closed the door on their times at Sydney, the club announced the signings of former English Premier League star Adam Le Fondre and on loan from Ajax, Siem de Jong. Fellow Dutchman Jop van der Linden was also revealed to be joining Sydney FC on a one year deal.

On 7 April 2021, Sydney FC became the first A-League club to record 200 wins with a 1–0 win over Perth Glory.

On 22 July 2022, Sydney FC secured the signing of Elvis Kamsoba from rivals Melbourne Victory.

Colours and badge

The primary club colour of Sydney FC is sky blue, which represents the state colour of New South Wales. The secondary club colour is navy blue, with additional contrasting colours of orange and white, however the colour orange does not feature in the club's 2017 redesign of the crest.

The current Sydney FC badge was released on 17 May 2017 and is a reworking of a design submitted by the club's supporter group, The Cove. The crest features the Sydney Opera House in white pictured in front of a sky-blue backdrop on top of a navy blue base featuring the Commonwealth Star. The Opera House represents an iconic landmark of Sydney, the sky-blue represents the club's primary colour and the state colour of New South Wales, and the Commonwealth Star, also found on the Australian Flag, is a symbol representing the Federation of Australia.

The initial Sydney FC badge was created and used since the club's founding in 2004. It featured a soccer ball set centrally in a stylised crest shape. Above the ball was the shape of three shells of the Sydney Opera House, and below that was the Commonwealth Star.

There is a silver star atop the badge with the numeral five written inside it, representing the number of championships the club has won.

Stadiums

Sydney FC plays its home matches at the newly constructed Sydney Football Stadium. The team moved into the stadium for the 2022–23 A-League Mens season. Their first match at the stadium was against the club's fierce rivals, Melbourne Victory on 8 October 2022 in front of 21,840 supporters. Sydney lost the match 2–3. 

The home ground was built as a replacement for the original Sydney Football Stadium. This stadium was built in 1988 to be the premium "rectangular field" for rugby league matches. It was also used for soccer and rugby union for major matches and domestic competition. The stadium was then demolished in 2019 to be rebuilt into a boutique, world class venue. It had been the venue for Australian international matches (notably World Cup Qualifier against Argentina in 1993). The stadium's capacity was stated at 41,159 prior to renovations in 2007, although the attendance of the 2006 A-League grand final exceeded this number by over 500. The stated capacity prior to demolition was 45,500. Sydney FC's final game at the stadium was a 2–3 extra time loss to Melbourne Victory in the 2017–18 A-League Semifinal, in which former Sky Blue player, Terry Antonis scored an incredible solo goal for the match-winner.

Prior to the current season, for four years whilst the new stadium was being built between the 2018–19 and 2021–22 seasons, Sydney played its home games out of two stadiums, Leichhardt Oval and Jubilee Oval. The Sydney Cricket Ground located in Moore Park was used in its first season of this redevelopment period. With a capacity of 46,000, it was used for the club's major fixtures during their time away from their traditional home, although this was eventually abandoned until the Sydney Derby on 23 May 2021. 

Sydney FC have played matches at other Sydney venues. Parramatta Stadium in western Sydney was the venue for an AFC Champions League match against Indonesian football side Persik Kediri in April 2007 when the SFS was unavailable due to an NRL match being played there. A friendly match against Los Angeles Galaxy was played at ANZ Stadium in November 2007 due to its greater capacity, and drew a crowd of 80,295. The club has also played regular season games there against Perth Glory in 2012, and Newcastle Jets and Melbourne City in 2016. Sydney played one home game at WIN Stadium in Wollongong on 3 January 2015 against Newcastle Jets. They also played at Campbelltown Stadium against Perth Glory in the 2011–12 A-League season. In 2020, Sydney used CommBank Stadium as its home venue for the 2019–20 A-League final series. In the semifinal, Sydney defeated Perth Glory 2–0 and in the Grand Final they defeated Melbourne City 1–0 after extra time, via a Rhyan Grant goal. 

On 17 May 2017, the club and SCG Trust agreed to a ten-year extension of the lease.

Training ground
Sydney FC's primary training ground is at Macquarie University in North Ryde, called Sky Park. It also hosts the clubs Women team, as well as all academy players, male and female. They also have use of the sports and aquatic centre for post match recovery sessions. Occasionally Sydney FC have been seen after home games having recovery sessions at local beaches such as Coogee Beach, Bondi Beach, and Maroubra.

Sponsorship

Supporters

As they were the only A-League team from Sydney until 2012, Sydney FC used to draw support from most of Sydney (much has been reclaimed by Western Sydney Wanderers, since their introduction in 2012), and as a result is one of the most heavily supported clubs in the Eastern Sydney region. The largest and main supporter group of Sydney FC is known as "The Cove", and were originally located at the Paddington (northern) end of Allianz Stadium in bays 22–26. The name came from the original name given to the colonial settlement of Sydney—Sydney Cove.

Cove members attend every home match and also travel as a group around the country to support the team at away matches. As a vocal group, The Cove demonstrates its support by singing football chants, wearing club colours, standing up, waving flags and holding banners. On 7 July 2006, Australian rock singer Jimmy Barnes recorded a club song entitled 'Sydney FC for Me' with 25 members of The Cove singing back-up vocals. It was released prior to the start of the 2006–07 season.

The Cove was directly involved the creation of the modern Sydney FC badge, with them putting forward designs and ideas which carried over to the finished product.

Rivalries

 Melbourne Victory – The Big Blue – The clash between Australia's two largest cities is perhaps the most historic rivalry in the league, with games between the two clubs often getting physical. Sydney and Melbourne have been rivals on many fronts for over a century.
 Western Sydney Wanderers – The Sydney Derby – With the introduction of the Wanderers into the competition, Sydney FC now contest a true local derby for the first time. The two teams played their first match on 20 October 2012 at the then Wanderers' home ground, Parramatta Stadium.  Sydney FC won the match 1–0 in front of a near-capacity crowd of 19,126 fans. On 15 December 2012 in the following derby, the Wanderers defeated Sydney FC 2–0 away from home; the two teams went on to draw 1–1 at the Wanderers' home ground during their third encounter. On 9 December 2017, Sydney FC had their largest Derby win with a 0–5 win over the Wanderers at ANZ Stadium, Sydney FC lead the head-to-head count with 15 Derby wins compared to the Wanderers' 9, with the clubs drawing 9. Sydney FC have scored 49 Derby goals while the Wanderers have scored 33.

Statistics and records

Rhyan Grant holds the record for Sydney FC appearances, having played 299 first-team matches between 2008 to 2023. The record for a goalkeeper is held by Andrew Redmayne, with 184 appearances.

The club's all-time top goalscorer in all competitions is Alex Brosque with 83 goals. Bobô has scored the second most goals for the club with 71 and whilst striker Adam Le Fondre is third with 67 goals.

Sydney FC's highest home attendance for a league match was 41,213, recorded on 18 October 2014 at the Sydney Football Stadium against the Western Sydney Wanderers in the Sydney Derby. The highest home attendance in any fixture is 80,295 recorded on 27 November 2007 for a friendly match against LA Galaxy at Stadium Australia.

Players

First-team squad

Youth

Players to have featured in a first-team matchday squad for Sydney FC

Former players

Academy
On 21 December 2009, Sydney FC established an academy to develop young players. The main goal of the academy was stated as to produce better players by providing technical and tactical knowledge, as well as to identify potential new talent that could represent Sydney in the National Youth League and A League in future. This began a continued commitment from Sydney to invest in and develop junior talent for the benefit of grassroots soccer. The initial 26 players were drawn from the NSW State League clubs and consisted of players aged 14–18 years old. They started training with the academy at Macquarie University.

Captains
Captains by Years (2005–present) A-League games only.

Managers

The club's current manager is Steve Corica. The club's previous manager was Graham Arnold, the longest-serving manager, who managed from August 2014 to 2018. There have been nine permanent and one caretaker manager of Sydney FC since the appointment of the first professional manager, Pierre Littbarski in 2005.

Coaching staff

Corporate hierarchy

Club awards

Hall of Fame

On 16 March 2015, Sydney FC inducted eight members into its inaugural Hall of Fame at the club's 10-year anniversary lunch. Additional inductees are added to the hall of fame at the annual end of season Sky Blue Ball.

Team of the Decade
In April 2015, Sydney FC also announced its Team of the Decade at the annual end of season awards night, the Sky Blue Ball.

End of Season Awards

Notes

AFC Club ranking

Honours

Domestic
 A-League Men Premiership 
Winners (4) : 2009–10, 2016–17, 2017–18, 2019–20 (record)
Runners-up (4): 2005–06, 2014–15, 2018–19, 2020–21

 A-League Men Championship 
Winners (5) : 2006, 2010, 2017, 2019, 2020 (record)
Runners-up (2): 2015, 2021

 Australia Cup
Winners (1): 2017
Runners-up (2): 2016, 2018

 Australian Club World Championship Qualifying Tournament
Winners (1): 2005

Continental
 OFC Champions League
Winners (1): 2005

Other

International record

See also

 List of Sydney FC seasons
 Sydney FC in international competition
 Sydney FC W-League

References

External links

 
A-League Men teams
Association football clubs established in 2004
Soccer clubs in Sydney
2004 establishments in Australia
OFC Champions League winning clubs